System Locked Pre-installation, often abbreviated as SLP, also referred to as OEM Activation, is a procedure used by major OEM computer-manufacturers in order to pre-activate Microsoft Windows before mass distribution.

Details
SLP comes in eight different version which roughly coincide with versions of Windows NT.

Operating systems that use SLP 1.0 check for a particular text-string in a computer's BIOS upon booting. If the text string does not match the information stored in the particular installation's OEM BIOS files, the system prompts the user to activate their copy as normal. SLP 2.0 to SLP 2.5 work in a similar manner. This effectively "locks" the operating system to the qualified motherboard. In addition, if an end-user feels the need to perform a "clean install" of Windows and if the manufacturer supplies the user with an installation disc (not a "System Recovery" disc that is a hard-drive image), the user will not be prompted to activate the copy, given that the installation is performed on the same motherboard. Furthermore, because the check only involves the BIOS and not hardware, a user is allowed to change virtually all hardware components within the machine except motherboard, a procedure that would normally trigger re-activation in retail copies of Windows. If the replacement board is the same brand and of the same broad vintage as the original, it will often be accepted by the OEM software. Manufacturers are generally only given a few SLP keys by Microsoft. A royalty has been paid by the manufacturer if the board has an SLP key. Each manufacturer is issued with their own modified copy of Windows XP or Windows 7 that recognizes their own unique keys. Windows 8 will install on any UEFI motherboard containing a valid encrypted Microsoft product key since a royalty has been prepaid. It is most probable that an individual OEM royalty is much less than the retail price of the same version of Windows.

The product key sticker attached to OEM computers, prior to Windows 8, will not activate the copy of windows supplied with the machine. Only the SLP key can do that and the product key is never requested during activation. The purpose of the external sticker with a key is not known with certainty, but it is most likely a way for Microsoft to check that items for retail sale have had a full royalty paid by the OEM. 

SLP installations require a master product key issued by each OEM maker, which is unique to the specific edition of Windows, such as Home (XP), Home Basic, Home Premium, Professional, Ultimate, etc. This SLP key is different from the product key printed on the Certificate of Authenticity affixed to an OEM assembled PC; COA product key is used in cases when Windows license stored is invalidated for some reason and re-activation is required. On February 28, 2005, Microsoft attempted to reduce software piracy by invalidating COA keys for normal online activation and requiring phone activation, but this does not apply to SLP keys which can still be used for offline activation. If the product key used for activation is lost, then product key finders, readily available on the Internet, can decrypt the key from a local installation, however only SLP keys allow the user to avoid activation upon re-installation. 

In the SLP 2.x implementations, BIOS report the ACPI SLIC table to the operating system.

However, since SLP 2.0 was introduced, hackers have been able to create modified bootloaders based on the bootloader GRUB4DOS; these are capable of emulating an SLP text string (such as one for Dell, Acer, and so on), so it appears to be present in the BIOS. This combined with an OEM certificate and OEM product key can instantly activate a Windows Vista/7 installation illegally but also be very hard to notice. This method can also be integrated into a Windows installation disk to activate on initial boot.  
 
Another method consists of modding the BIOS to insert the SLP 2.1-2.5 table, which can be used to replace blacklisted keys, or to add the SLP table to motherboards that do not have it (such as Gigabyte). Some brand-name computers such as Dell, already have the SLP table in their BIOS, which means that using software readily available on the Internet, a pirated retail installation can be converted to OEM, and the appropriate certificate installed into the OS, which results in Windows becoming genuine. Pirates refer to copies of Windows activated in this way as Pirated Genuine Microsoft Software.

With SLP 3.0, OEM SLP keys are no longer used at all. Instead, a tool is used by the OEM to embed a unique key in each computer's BIOS, making consumer versions of Windows 8 and later very difficult to pirate using the SLP insertion technique.  In the SLP 3.0 implementations, BIOS report the ACPI MSDM table to the operating system.

Microsoft released the following generic product keys that users can enter to avoid product activation on any SLP-enabled computer using the corresponding version of Windows XP:
(Please note that the following keys are not volume license keys (VLK). The installation source must also be SLP-enabled by the manufacturer. Microsoft has not publicly released an SLP key for Windows XP Home Edition, but the actual key from any SLP-activated installation of XP Home can be used on any other, regardless of brand. SLP-enabled installation CDs usually supply the needed key automatically, without the user having to enter one.)

Note that generic keys for versions of Windows later than XP will install the operating system in trial mode, and will request a new key after the trial period is up.

See also
 Windows Preinstallation Environment
 Windows 8.1

References

External links
 http://support.microsoft.com/kb/899356/en-us
 https://technet.microsoft.com/en-us/library/dd727762.aspx
 https://technet.microsoft.com/en-us/library/bb457078.aspx
 https://technet.microsoft.com/en-us/library/dd941645.aspx
 https://technet.microsoft.com/en-us/library/ff793421.aspx
 https://technet.microsoft.com/en-us/library/jj612867.aspx

Windows administration